Wolfgang Amadeus Mozart's operas comprise 22 musical dramas in a variety of genres. They range from the small-scale, derivative works of his youth to the full-fledged operas of his maturity. Three of the works were abandoned before completion and were not performed until many years after the composer's death. His mature works are all considered classics and have never been out of the repertory of the world's opera houses.

From a very young age Mozart had, according to opera analyst David Cairns, "an extraordinary capacity ... for seizing on and assimilating whatever in a newly encountered style (was) most useful to him". In a letter to his father, dated 7 February 1778, Mozart wrote, "As you know, I can more or less adopt or imitate any kind and style of composition". He used this gift to break new ground, becoming simultaneously "assimilator, perfector and innovator". Thus, his early works follow the traditional forms of the Italian opera seria and opera buffa as well as the German Singspiel. In his maturity, according to music writer Nicholas Kenyon, he "enhanced all of these forms with the richness of his innovation", and, in Don Giovanni, he achieved a synthesis of the two Italian styles, including a seria character in Donna Anna, buffa characters in Leporello and Zerlina, and a mixed seria-buffa character in Donna Elvira. Unique among composers, Mozart ended all his mature operas, starting with Idomeneo, in the key of the overture.

Ideas and characterisations introduced in the early works were subsequently developed and refined. For example, Mozart's later operas feature a series of memorable, strongly drawn female characters, in particular the so-called "Viennese soubrettes" who, in opera writer Charles Osborne's phrase, "contrive to combine charm with managerial instinct". Music writer and analyst Gottfried Kraus has remarked that all these women were present, as prototypes, in the earlier operas; Bastienne (1768), and Sandrina (La finta giardiniera, 1774) are precedents for the later Constanze and Pamina, while Sandrina's foil Serpetta is the forerunner of Blonde, Susanna, Zerlina and Despina.

Mozart's texts came from a variety of sources, and the early operas were often adaptations of existing works. The first librettist chosen by Mozart himself appears to have been Giambattista Varesco, for Idomeneo in 1781. Five years later, he began his most enduring collaboration, with Lorenzo Da Ponte, his "true phoenix". The once widely held theory that Da Ponte was the librettist for the discarded Lo sposo deluso of 1783/84 has now been generally rejected. Mozart felt that, as the composer, he should have considerable input into the content of the libretto, so that it would best serve the music. Musicologist Charles Rosen writes, "it is possible that Da Ponte understood the dramatic necessities of Mozart's style without prompting; but before his association with da Ponte, Mozart had already bullied several librettists into giving him the dramatically shaped ensembles he loved."

Compiling the list

Basis for inclusion
The list includes all the theatrical works generally accepted as composed by Wolfgang Amadeus Mozart. In this context "theatrical" means performed on a stage, by vocalists singing in character, in accordance with stage directions. Some sources have adopted more specific criteria, leading them to exclude the early "Sacred Singspiel" Die Schuldigkeit des ersten Gebots, which they classify as an oratorio. However, as Osborne makes clear, the libretto contains stage directions which suggest that the work was acted, not merely sung, and it is formally described as a "geistliches Singspiel" (sacred play with music), not as an oratorio. The Singspiel Der Stein der Weisen was written in collaboration with four other composers, so it is only partially credited to Mozart.

Sequence
In general, the list follows the sequence in which the operas were written. There is uncertainty about whether La finta semplice was written before or after Bastien und Bastienne, and in some listings the former is given priority. Thamos was written in two segments, the earlier in 1774, but is listed in accordance with its completion in 1779–80. Die Zauberflöte and La clemenza di Tito were written concurrently. Die Zauberflote was started earlier and put aside for the Tito commission, which was completed and performed first and is usually listed as the earlier work despite having a higher Köchel catalogue number.

List of operas
Key:  Incomplete opera  Collaborative work

Notes

References
Citations

Cited sources

Further reading

External links

Opera libretti, critical editions, diplomatic editions, source evaluation (German only), links to online DME recordings; Digital Mozart Edition

Operas
 
Mozart